This is a list of all counties (including Autonomous counties, Autonomous banners, and Banners) along with County-level cities and City districts. The list goes by province name, then ascending division code. Note that some numbers are skipped as those division codes were used by former county-level divisions now part of another county-level division. This list also includes the counties that are administered by the Republic of China (ROC), which are claimed by the PRC in its Taiwan and Fujian provinces.

List

Dissolved Counties

Name Changes

References

County
China 3
Territorial disputes of the Republic of China